Alphonse Adolphe Cusin (6 May 1820 in Melun – 26 December 1894 in the 13th arrondissement of Paris) was a French architect, a student of Alfred de Dreux.

Selected works 
 1861: Théâtre de la Gaîté Lyrique
 1869:

External links 

 Alphonse Cusin on Structurae
 Alphonse Cusin on Détails d'architecture
 Alphonse Cusin on Musée d'Orsay
 Alphonse-Adolphe Cusin, Théâtre de la Gaîté on Musée D'orsay

19th-century French architects
People from Melun
1820 births
1894 deaths